Benny Shabtai is an Israeli businessman. He was the president of Raymond Weil USA which was the exclusive distributor of Raymond Weil watches in the United States until 2009 when he sold his company. In 2014, Shabtai and his family also sold their controlling share in Viber, the Israeli instant-messaging, voice and video calling app.

Early life
Benny Shabtai was born in Tel Aviv and raised on a kibbutz. He has two siblings. He served for three years in the Israeli army, after which he worked as a bodyguard for the Israeli ambassador in Paris, France, where his father was stationed as an envoy. After two years in Paris, he traveled to South Africa, where he worked as a croupier at a casino in Swaziland. He returned to Israel to rejoin the army, serving during the 1973 Yom Kippur War.

Business career
After completing his reserve duty, Shabtai relocated to the U.S. He began working at the now defunct Eastman Watch Company, an importer of inexpensive watches from Hong Kong. At the industry's International Watch and Jewellery Fair in Basel, Switzerland, he met Raymond Weil, the eponymous head of the Swiss luxury watchmaker and she agreed to sell him four hundred Raymond Weil watches, which he then sold to two clients in the U.S. As owner and president of Raymond Weil USA (established in 1977), Shabtai was the exclusive distributor in the U.S. until 2009 when he sold the company. 
 
In February 2014, the $900 million sale of Viber, an Israeli instant messaging, voice and video calling app, to Japanese company Rakuten earned the Shabtai family (Benny, his brother Gilad, and Gilad's son Ofer) some $500 million from their 55.2% stake.

Activism
Shabtai is a board member of Friends of the Israel Defense Forces (FIDF), an American organization that supports Israeli soldiers. From 1996 to 2012, he chaired the FIDF National New York Gala Dinner at the Waldorf Astoria New York, at which, in 2011, $23 million were raised., while $26 million were raised the following year.

Shabtai calls his involvement with FIDF in "educating" the American people on "the sacrifices of young Israeli soldiers and the dangers they experience" as his "greatest success," adding, "It's the best thing I've done in my life. The issue is very close to me."

In 2014, the Shabtai Jewish Global Membership Society at Yale University, established through Benny Shabtai's donation, purchased a New Haven, Connecticut mansion for $1.5 million, according to city records, as its new residence.

Personal life
Shabtai is divorced from Lori Weitz with whom they had three children. In 2015, Shabtai married Stacey Cooper.

References

Living people
Israeli emigrants to the United States
Israeli businesspeople
Jewish American philanthropists
Israeli philanthropists
Israeli Jews
American investors
Israeli investors
Israeli expatriates in France
Year of birth missing (living people)
21st-century American Jews